Brodnica Górna  (Cashubian Górnô Brodnica) is a village in the administrative district of Gmina Kartuzy, within Kartuzy County, Pomeranian Voivodeship, in northern Poland. It is located within the ethnocultural region of Kashubia in the historic region of Pomerania.

The village has a population of 1,156.

During the German occupation of Poland (World War II), in September 1939, local priest Bernard Szutta was among 10 Polish priests murdered by the German Einsatzkommando 16 in the forest near Kartuzy (see Nazi crimes against the Polish nation).

References

Villages in Kartuzy County